The Most Exalted Order of the Star of India is an order of chivalry founded by Queen Victoria in 1861. The Order includes members of three classes:

 Knight Grand Commander (GCSI)
 Knight Commander (KCSI)
 Companion (CSI)

No appointments have been made since the 1948 New Year Honours, shortly after the Partition of India in 1947. With the death in 2009 of the last surviving knight, the Maharaja of Alwar, the order became dormant.

The motto of the order was "Heaven's Light Our Guide". The Star of India emblem, the insignia of order and the informal emblem of British India, was also used as the basis of a series of flags to represent the Indian Empire.

The order was the fifth most senior British order of chivalry, following the Order of the Garter, Order of the Thistle, Order of St Patrick and Order of the Bath. It is the senior order of chivalry associated with the British Raj; junior to it is the Most Eminent Order of the Indian Empire, and there is also, for women only, the Imperial Order of the Crown of India.

History
Several years after the Indian Mutiny and the consolidation of Great Britain's power as the governing authority in India, it was decided by the British Crown to create a new order of knighthood to honour Indian Princes and Chiefs, as well as British officers and administrators who served in India. On 25 June 1861, the following proclamation was issued by Queen Victoria:

Recipients

Knights Companion
19 persons were appointed Knights Companion at the creation of the Order:

 The Prince Consort
 The Prince of Wales
 Earl Canning, GCB, Governor-General of India and Grand Master of the Order
 Sir James Outram, Bt, GCB, Member of the Viceroy's Council
 Lord Harris, Governor of Madras
 Sir George Russell Clerk, Governor of Bombay
 Sir John Laird Mair Lawrence, Bt, GCB, Lieutenant-Governor of Punjab
 Sir Hugh Henry Rose, GCB, Commander-in-Chief of the Indian Army
 Viscount Gough, former Commander-in-Chief of the Indian Army
 Lord Clyde, former Commander-in-Chief of the Indian Army
 Tukojirao Holkar II, Maharaja of Indore
 Afzal-ud-Daulah, 5th Nizam of Hyderabad
 Jayajirao Scindia, Maharaja of Gwalior
 Duleep Singh, former Maharaja of the Sikh Empire
 Ranbir Singh Dogra, Maharaja of Jammu and Kashmir
 Yusef Ali Khan, Nawab of Rampur
 Nawab Sikander Begum, Nawab Begum of Bhopal
 Narendra Singh, Maharaja of Patiala
 Khanderao II Gaekwad, Maharaja of Baroda

12 additional Knights Companion were appointed over the next five years. 
 19 August 1861
 [Stapleton Cotton, 1st Viscount Combermere|Viscount Combermere]],  former Commander-in-Chief of the Indian Army
 Sir George Pollock, Bt. GCB, former commander of British forces in Afghanistan
 11 November 1863
 Ram Singh II, Maharajah of Jaipur
 Swarup Singh, Rajah of Jind
 10 December 1864
 Randhir Singh, Rajah of Kapurthala
 Raghuraj Singh Ju Deo Bahadur, Maharaja of Rewa
 12 February 1866
 Sir Robert Montgomery, former Lieutenant-Governor of Punjab
 Sir Henry Bartle Frere, Bt., GCB, Governor of Bombay
 Takht Singh, Maharajah of Jodhpur
 Ayilyam Thirunal, Maharajah of Travancore
 General Sir William Mansfield, KCB, Commander-in-Chief of the Indian Army
 Madan Pal, Maharaja of Karauli

On 24 May 1866, the Order was expanded to additional ranks. All surviving Knights Companion were elevated to Grand Commander.

Later appointments
Additional appointments were made to the Order in the ranks of Grand Commander, Knight Commander, and Companion. These include

 Shahu of Kolhapur, Maharaja of Kolhapur
 Maharaja Bir Shamsher Jang Bahadur Rana of Nepal
 Maharaja Bahadur Sir JAIMANGAL Singh of Gidhaur Estate KCSI 24.05.1866.
 Maharaja Bahadur Sir Ravaneshwar Singh of Gidhaur Estate KCIE 25.05.1895.
 Nawab Sir Khwaja Salimullah Bahadur, Nawab of Dhaka
 Mir Osman Ali Khan Siddiqi Bayafandi - Asaf Jah VII - 7th Nizam of Hyderabad
 Maharaj Bhim Shamsher Jang Bahadur Rana
 Sadeq Mohammad Khan IV, Nawab of Bahawalpur

The last appointments to the Order were made in the 1948 New Year Honours, some months after the Partition of India in August 1947.

The Order has never been formally abolished, and Charles III succeeded his mother Elizabeth II as Sovereign of the Orders when he ascended the throne in 2022. He remains Sovereign of the Order to this day. However, there are no living members of the Order.

The Order of the Indian Empire, founded in 1877, was intended to be a less exclusive version of the Order of the Star of India; consequently, many more appointments were made to the latter than to the former.

As the last Grand Master of the Orders, the Earl Mountbatten of Burma was also the last known individual to wear publicly the stars of a Knight Grand Commander of both Orders, during the Queen's Silver Jubilee celebrations in 1977.

 There were only three female members of the Order: Nawab Sikander Begum of Bhopal; Nawab Sikander's daughter, Shah Jahan Begum of Bhopal; and Queen Mary, consort of George V.
 The last Grand Master of the Order, Admiral of the Fleet The Earl Mountbatten of Burma (1900–1979), was assassinated by the Provisional IRA on 27 August 1979.
 The last surviving Knight Grand Commander, Maharaja Sree Padmanabhadasa Sir Chithira Thirunal Balarama Varma GCSI, GCIE, Maharajah of Travancore (1912–1991), died 19 July 1991 in Trivandrum.
 The last surviving Knight Commander, Maharaja Sir Tej Singh Prabhakar Bahadur KCSI (1911–2009), Maharaja of Alwar, died on 15 February 2009 in New Delhi.
 The last surviving Companion of the Order, Vice-Admiral Sir Ronald Brockman CSI (1909–1999), died on 3 September 1999 in London.

Composition

The British Sovereign was, and still is, Sovereign of the Order. The next most senior member was the Grand Master, a position held ex officio by the Viceroy of India. When the order was established in 1861, there was only one class of Knights Companion, who bore the postnominals KSI. In 1866, however, it was expanded to three classes. Members of the first class were known as "Knights Grand Commander" (rather than the usual "Knights Grand Cross") so as not to offend the non-Christian Indians appointed to the Order. All those surviving members who had already been made Knights Companion of the Order were retroactively known as Knights Grand Commander.

Former viceroys and other high officials, as well as those who served in the Department of the Secretary of State for India for at least thirty years were eligible for appointment. Rulers of Indian Princely States were also eligible for appointment. Some states were of such importance that their rulers were almost always appointed Knights Grand Commanders; such rulers included the Nizam of Hyderabad, the Maharaja of Mysore, the Maharaja of Jammu and Kashmir, the Maharaja of Baroda, the Maharajas of Gwalior, the Nawab of Bhopal, the Maharaja of Indore, the Maharajas of Singrauli, the Maharana of Udaipur, the Maharaja of Travancore, the Maharaja of Jodhpur and the Maharao of Cutch.

Kashi Naresh Prabhu Narayan Singh of Benares and Sir Azizul Haque were appointed Knight Commander of the Order of the Indian Empire (KCIE) in 1892 and 1941 respectively, Knight Grand Commander of the Order of the Indian Empire (GCIE) in 1898, and Knight Grand Commander of the Order of the Star of India (GCSI) for his services in the First World War in the 1921 New Year Honours.

Rulers of other nations in Asia and the Middle East, including the Emir of Kuwait, the Maharajas of the Rana dynasty, the Khedive of Egypt, the King of Bhutan and the rulers of Zanzibar, Bahrain and Oman were also appointed to the Order. Like some rulers of princely states, some rulers of particular prestige, for example the Maharajas of the Rana dynasty or the Sultans of Oman, were usually appointed Knights Grand Commanders.

Women, save the princely rulers, were ineligible for appointment to the order. They were, unlike the habit of many other orders, admitted as "Knights", rather than as "Dames" or "Ladies". The first woman to be admitted to the order was Nawab Sikandar Begum Sahiba, Nawab Begum of Bhopal; she was created a Knight Companion at the Order's foundation in 1861. The order's statutes were specially amended to permit the admission of Queen Mary as a Knight Grand Commander in 1911.

Vestments and accoutrements

Members of the Order wore elaborate costumes on important ceremonial occasions:
 The mantle, worn only by Knights Grand Commander, was made of light blue satin lined with white silk. On the left side was a representation of the star (see below).
 The collar, also worn only by Knights Grand Commander, was made of gold. It was composed of alternating figures of lotuses, red and white roses and palm branches, with an imperial crown in the centre.

On certain "collar days" designated by the Sovereign, members attending formal events wore the order's collar over their military uniform, formal day dress, or evening wear. When collars were worn (either on collar days or on formal occasions such as coronations), the badge was suspended from the collar.

At less important occasions, simpler insignia were used:
 The star, worn only by Knights Grand Commanders and Knights Commanders, included a sunburst, with twenty-six large rays alternating with twenty-six small rays; it was in gold and circular for Knights Grand Commanders, and in silver and eight-pointed for Knights Commanders. In the centre of the sunburst was a light blue ring bearing the motto of the Order. Within the ribbon was a five-pointed star, decorated with diamonds for Knights Grand Commanders.
 The badge was worn by Knights Grand Commanders on a white-edged light blue riband, or sash, passing from the right shoulder to the left hip, and by Knights Commanders and Companions from a white-edged light blue ribbon around the neck. It included an oval, containing the effigy of the Sovereign, surrounded by a light blue ring bearing the motto of the Order; the oval was suspended from a five-pointed star, which may be decorated with diamonds depending on class.

Unlike the insignia of most other British chivalric orders, the insignia of the Order of the Star of India did not incorporate crosses, as they were deemed unacceptable to the Indian Princes appointed to the Order.

Precedence and privileges
Members of all classes of the Order were assigned positions in the order of precedence. Wives of members of all classes also featured on the order of precedence, as did sons, daughters and daughters-in-law of Knights Grand Commanders and Knights Commanders. (See order of precedence in England and Wales for the exact positions.)

Knights Grand Commanders used the post-nominal initials "GCSI", Knights Commanders "KCSI" and Companions "CSI". Knights Grand Commanders and Knights Commanders prefixed "Sir" to their forenames. Wives of Knights Grand Commanders and Knights Commanders could prefix "Lady" to their surnames. Such forms were not used by peers and Indian princes, except when the names of the former were written out in their fullest forms.

Knights Grand Commanders were also entitled to receive heraldic supporters. They could, furthermore, encircle their arms with a depiction of the circlet (a circle bearing the motto) and the collar; the former is shown either outside or on top of the latter. Knights Commanders and Companions were permitted to display the circlet, but not the collar, surrounding their arms. The badge is depicted suspended from the collar or circlet.

Gallery

See also
List of Knights Grand Commander of the Order of the Star of India

References

External links
 
 Proclamation founding the Order of the Star of India, london-gazette.co.uk, 25 June 1861.

 
Orders of chivalry of the United Kingdom
Orders, decorations, and medals of British India
1861 establishments in the United Kingdom
Awards established in 1861
Orders, decorations, and medals of the British Empire